Roundhouse may refer to:

Architecture and buildings

Types
 Roundhouse (dwelling), a kind of house with circular walls, prehistoric and modern, all over the world
Atlantic roundhouse, an Iron Age stone building found in the northern and western parts of mainland Scotland, the Northern Isles and the Hebrides
 Roundhouse (lock-up), a small jail
 Roundhouse (windmill), the substructure of a post mill which encloses the trestle and forms a storage facility
 Railway roundhouse, a building used by railroads for servicing locomotives
 Roundhouse, or gin gang, an extension to a threshing barn

Australia
 Round House (Western Australia), an historic structure in Fremantle, originally used as a jail
 Broadmeadow roundhouse, a former railway roundhouse at the Broadmeadow Locomotive Depot
 Goulburn roundhouse, a former railway roundhouse at the Goulburn Rail Heritage Centre
 Valley Heights roundhouse, a former railway roundhouse at the Valley Heights Locomotive Depot Heritage Museum
 The Roundhouse, an entertainment venue at the University of New South Wales

Canada 
 Esquimalt and Nanaimo Railway Roundhouse

United Kingdom
 Roundhouse (venue), an entertainment venue and former railway roundhouse in Chalk Farm, London, England
 Dagenham Roundhouse, a pub and venue in East London
 Horton Rounds, a Grade II listed house in Northamptonshire, England, sometimes referred to as the Round House
 St Giles's Roundhouse, a prison in London, England
 That Roundhouse, a private eco-dwelling within the Pembrokeshire Coast National Park in Wales
 The Round House (Havering), a Georgian villa in outer London
 The Round House, Stanton Drew, a former toll house in Somerset
 Round House (London Zoo), a 1933 gorilla house in the Modernist style

United States
 Round House (Barnstable, Massachusetts), 1930, a three-story wood frame round house
 Round House (Connecticut), a rotating residence designed by Richard Foster
 Round House (Somerville, Massachusetts)
 Roundhouse Railroad Museum, now the Georgia State Railroad Museum, in Savannah, Georgia, United States
 Round House (Los Angeles) or Garden of Paradise, an 1847 adobe landmark
 Round House, the exercise term for a DEFCON 3 alert

Russia
The Round Houses in Moscow

Nicknames
 Charles Koch Arena, Wichita, Kansas
 McKenzie Arena, Chattanooga, Tennessee
 New Mexico State Capitol, Santa Fe, New Mexico
 Philadelphia Police Department headquarters, Pennsylvania

Elsewhere
 Round House (Nunspeet, Netherlands)
 Round House (Odessa), a historic building in Odessa, Ukraine

Arts and entertainment
 Roundhouse (album), a 1990 album by Tar
 Roundhouse (periodical), a magazine publication by the New South Wales Rail Transport Museum
 Roundhouse (TV series), a Nickelodeon television show
 Round House Theatre, a non-profit theater production company in Maryland
 The Round House (novel), a 2011 novel by Louise Erdrich
 Roundhouse Recording Studios, a London recording studio founded by Gerry Bron in 1975

Other uses
 Roundhouse punch in boxing, delivered in a circular direction, instead of a straight line
 Roundhouse kick, a martial arts technique